The Beck No. 2 Mine near Eureka, Utah dates from 1890.  It was listed on the National Register of Historic Places in 1979.  The listing included "surface plant buildings" of the lead mine (two contributing buildings) and one other contributing structure, a "remaining wooden headframe", described as a "fifty foot wooden headframe A-frame Montana type".  These evoke the past mining operations at the site.

See also
Charcoal Kilns (Eureka, Utah), NRHP-listed
Lime Kilns (Eureka, Utah), NRHP-listed

References

1890 establishments in Utah Territory
Buildings and structures in Utah County, Utah
Industrial buildings and structures on the National Register of Historic Places in Utah
Mines in Utah
Lead mines in the United States
National Register of Historic Places in Utah County, Utah